The Newman Jets are the athletic teams that represent Newman University, located in Wichita, Kansas, in intercollegiate sports as a member of the Division II level of the National Collegiate Athletic Association (NCAA), primarily competing in the Mid-America Intercollegiate Athletics Association (MIAA) for most of its sports as an associate member since the 2019–20 academic year (before achieving full member status in 2022–23); while its men's soccer team competes in the Great American Conference (GAC). The Jets previously competed in the D-II Heartland Conference from 2006–07 to 2018–19; and in the defunct Midlands Collegiate Athletic Conference (MCAC) of the National Association of Intercollegiate Athletics (NAIA) from 1999–2000 to 2005–06.

Varsity teams 
Newman competes in 19 intercollegiate varsity sports: Men's sports include baseball, basketball, bowling, cross country, golf, soccer, tennis, triathlon and wrestling; while women's sports include basketball, bowling, cheer & dance, cross country, golf, soccer, softball, tennis, triathlon and volleyball.

Facilities
 Fugate Gymnasium: men's and women's basketball, women's volleyball, and wrestling
 McCarthy Field: baseball
 Newman Softball Field: softball
 Wilkins Field men's and women's soccer
 Martin Park Gold Learning Center: men's and women's golf

On February 2, 2013, Newman University recognized the Potter family in dedicating Fugate Gymnasium as "Potter Family Court". The proceeds towards this event went to the Potter Family Scholarship, given to Newman student athletes. Newman University also has their student athletes participate with an organization called Student-Athlete Advisory Committee (SAAC). Within this organization student-athletes are to focus on raising money for organizations within the Wichita community and to organize events on campus.

Newman University also has a Hall of Fame, which honors these people or organizations for their contribution towards the university. Inductees include Larry Inlow, who was inducted into the Hall of Fame in 2010. He has contributed to the Wichita community and recently has been named 2013 Wichita B-52s (Professional Arena Soccer League) head coach.

In 2021, Newman announced new branding and logos for the athletic department and a new mission statement.

Championships

Fight song
"The Heartbeat" is the official fight song of Newman University.

References

External links